The Holm of Faray is a small island in Orkney, Scotland, near Faray and Westray, which it lies between.  Together with its neighbour Faray, it is designated  a SSSI due to its importance as a haul-out site and breeding area for grey seals.

Geography and geology
Holm of Faray is made up of red sandstone. It is effectively a continuation of Faray, but separated from it by Lavey Sound. It has a "head" and a "torso", which are created by East Bight and West Bight, which almost create a separate islet.

It is separated from Westray by Rapness Sound in the west (an extension of Westray Firth) and Weatherness Sound to the north.

References

Sites of Special Scientific Interest in Orkney
Uninhabited islands of Orkney